Evelyn Baring, 1st Earl of Cromer,  (26 February 1841 – 29 January 1917) was a British statesman, diplomat and colonial administrator. He served as the British controller-general in Egypt during 1879, part of the international control which oversaw Egyptian finances after the Egyptian bankruptcy of 1876. He later became the agent and consul-general in Egypt from 1883 to 1907 during the British occupation, prompted by the Urabi revolt. This position gave Baring de facto control over Egyptian finances and governance.

Baring's programmes led to limited economic development in Egypt in certain areas, but deepened its dependence on cash crops, as well as regressing some of its social developments (such as the state school system).

Early life and military career
Baring was the ninth son of Henry Baring and his second wife, Cecilia Anne (née Windham). The English branch of the Baring family descends from John (Johann) Baring, who emigrated from Germany in 1717.  John's son Sir Francis was the founder of Barings Bank. Henry was the third son of Sir Francis. When he died in 1848, seven-year old Evelyn was sent to boarding school. When he was 14, he entered the Royal Military Academy, graduating at 17 with a lieutenant's commission in the Royal Artillery.  He was initially posted to a battery on the island of Corfu.

While on Corfu, Baring became aware of his own lack of education, and began a campaign of self-education, learning Greek and becoming fluent in Italian. He also took a mistress and fathered a daughter out of wedlock, Louisa Sophia. In 1862, he accepted a position as aide-de-camp to Sir Henry Storks, High Commissioner of the Ionian Islands.  This position ended in 1864, with the union of Corfu with Greece.  Later in 1864, Storks was appointed the governor of Malta, again employing Baring as an aide-de-camp.  The next year Baring accompanied Storks to Jamaica, where Storks headed the official inquiry into the Morant Bay rebellion.  In 1868, Baring was selected to attend the Army's Staff College; he graduated in late 1869. He then worked for two years in the War Office, helping to implement post-Crimean War reforms.

Finding a military career not to his liking, Baring went to India in 1872 as private secretary to his cousin Lord Northbrook, Viceroy of India, and quickly discovered that he had a knack for administration. With Northbrook's resignation in 1876, Baring returned to England. He received the C.S.I., and was promoted to major. Baring married Ethel Errington in 1876 and the following year resigned from the army.

British Controller-General of Egypt

When Baring first arrived in Egypt in 1877, the country's finances were in shambles. Ismail Pasha, Khedive of Egypt, borrowed millions of pounds from European financiers for projects to build the Suez Canal, his personal use, and to cover persistent tax shortfalls. His finances depended on money obtained from Egypt's cotton industry, which flourished during the American Civil War. But after the war, as American cotton entered European markets once again, the price of cotton fell dramatically.  As a result, Egypt's cotton was no longer the cash crop it used to be.  Ismail Pasha found himself unable to pay off even the interest on his debts.

At first, Ismail attempted to call on his parliament to raise more tax money, but Parliament resisted, as it consisted mostly of large landowners, who were lightly taxed. In desperation, Ismail turned to the European powers to help him out of his financial troubles. After some rocky negotiations the Dual Control system was instituted, whereby a French and a British controller were appointed to oversee Egypt's finances. Sir Evelyn Baring was appointed as the British Controller. Egyptian historian Al-Sayyid Marsot considers this desperate attempt on Ismail's part to obtain European help to have opened the way for foreign control of Egypt's finances, and eventual incorporation of Egypt into the British Empire.

Baring and his fellow controller's de facto control of Egypt's finances meant they wielded considerable influence in both the Egyptian and British governments. Owning a large proportion of Egypt's debt himself, when Ismail refused to declare bankruptcy, Baring pressured his government to depose Ismail, which they did in 1879. The general population of Egypt widely blamed Ismail for the country's financial struggles, and his removal was greeted with relief. Ismail was succeeded by his son Tawfiq, who cooperated with the European consuls.

Consul-General of Egypt

The 'Urabi Revolt, led by Ahmed 'Urabi, a rising Egyptian colonel, endangered the Khedivate. After the subsequent intervention by the British in Alexandria (the 1882 Anglo-Egyptian War), Baring returned from India to Egypt as the British agent and consul-general, "with a mandate for minor reforms and a prompt withdrawal of British troops". Baring though advocated for a continued occupation of Egypt and disparaged Egyptian demands for independence.

Baring's first act as Consul-General was to approve of the Dufferin Report, which essentially called for a puppet parliament with no real power. In addition, the report asserted the need for British supervision of reforms deemed necessary for the country. Furthermore, it stated the interests of the Suez Canal zone should always be maintained. Baring believed that because of Egyptian administrative incompetence, a long occupation was essential to any sort of reform. Moreover, he established a new guiding principle for Egypt known as the Granville Doctrine (named for the Secretary of State for Foreign Affairs, Lord Granville). The doctrine enabled Baring and other British officials to fill the government with those Egyptian politicians that would be cooperative with the British and the power to dismiss Egyptian ministers who refused to accept British directives. Under Baring, British officials were positioned in key ministries and a new system, known as the Veiled Protectorate, was introduced. Essentially, the government was a façade. Egyptian ministers were the outward form, yet British officials held the actual power. Baring thus remained the real ruler of Egypt until 1907, and this arrangement worked well for the first ten years of British control because Tawfiq Pasha was a weak man more than happy to abdicate any governmental responsibility. The Egyptian army, which Baring considered utterly untrustworthy due to its previous mutinies against the Khedive, was disbanded and a new army organized along British lines (much like in India). With Egyptian finances stabilised by 1887, Baring also compelled the government in Cairo to abandon any pretension of reconquering the Sudan, which Egypt had lost control of following the Mahdist Rebellion. Careful (and often stingy) handling of the budget, plus promotion of irrigation projects, brought considerable economic prosperity to Egypt. Baring believed that at some point in the future, British control of Egypt would end and full independence would be restored, but only once the Egyptian people learned proper self-governance.

Afaf Lutfi Sayyid-Marsot contends that under Baring, Egyptian nationalists were inert and many Egyptians believed in Britain's policy of "rescue and retire", but that Baring had no intention of doing so as, Marsot says, "Baring believed that 'subject races' were totally incapable of self-government, that they did not really need or want self-government, and that what they really needed was a 'full belly' policy which kept it quiescent and allowed the elite to make money and so cooperate with the occupying power."

In 1892, Tawfiq died and Abbas Hilmi II succeeded him. The young, ambitious khedive wanted to expel foreign influence and to that end encouraged a nationalist movement, but he had not reckoned with Baring, who quickly intimidated him into submission.  Recent research, however, has shown that the Egyptian nationalist movement was active until the late 1890s, mainly from the secret societies surrounding the new Khedive.  These were led by the young nationalist leader Mustafa Kamil and supported by foreign local elements, especially among the French and Greek communities of Egypt.

Lord Cromer had a negative experience in India, where advanced education led to Indian nationalism that was highly critical of the Raj. In Egypt Cromer reduced the budget for education, closed many of the specialized postsecondary institutions, and refocused the curriculum on vocational topics. Tuition fees were imposed which reduced the availability for most Egyptians.

Baring was embroiled in controversy in both Egypt and Britain in the wake of severe punishments meted out to Egyptian peasants following the 1906 Denshawai Incident, even though he was out of the country at the time and had no direct involvement. The new Liberal government under Prime Minister Sir Henry Campbell-Bannerman decided to adopt a more lenient policy towards Egypt, and Baring, sensing the end was near, offered his resignation in April 1907. The official reason given for his departure was health issues. In July 1907, Parliament awarded him £50,000 in recognition of his "eminent services" in Egypt.

Honors
Baring was in August 1901 created Viscount Errington, of Hexham, in the County of Northumberland, and Earl of Cromer, in the County of Norfolk. In June 1902 he received an honorary doctorate (D.C.L.) from the University of Oxford, and in 1906, Baring was made a Member of the Order of Merit by King Edward VII.

Baring, women, and Islam 
Baring held a 'traditional Orientalist' perspective in relation to the East, Egypt in particular, believing Westerners to be inherently superior in every way when compared to Egyptians. According to Edward Said, Baring believed the 'Orient' and its inhabitants were meant to be subdued and disciplined by the Western world.

In 1901 Baring discovered that increased enrollment in primary schools had resulted in a growing demand for secondary school enrollment opportunities. Women and men alike had begun to seek higher education as an opportunity to be eligible for government positions and upward mobility. Instead of increasing Egyptians' opportunities to receive education, Baring held that subsidized education was not the province of the government and instead raised tuition fees at existing primary schools in order to cut enrollment. Both women's and men's institutions suffered from Baring's new legislation, fuelled by his fear that an educated working class might foster dangerous nationalistic sentiments against the colonial government. Baring went on to curb opportunities for women already working in the professional world by discrediting their skill; he urged Egyptians that female doctors were not as adept as their male counterparts and that, in the Western world, men were the most trusted medical practitioners. When Egyptians complained about the lack of jobs available to them (due in large part to limited access to education), Baring went so far as to deny the existence of an Egyptian nationality. He worked specifically to limit employment opportunities for women.

In line with his Orientalist views, Baring believed Egyptian society and the Islamic world as a whole to be inherently inferior to the Western world. As such, it was a culture that, in Baring's eyes, bred inferior people with inferior minds and ideas. According to Baring, Egypt could only succeed in the modern world once it had eliminated Islam from its culture. In particular, Baring believed the subordinate nature of Eastern culture was made blatantly obvious in its treatment of women. Baring argued that Westernized Christianity elevated the status of women while Islam taught that women should be degraded through the veil and segregation based on gender.

Baring's opinions on segregation and the veil in particular went on to influence popular and academic discourse surrounding issues of women and Islam. Baring initiated unveiling campaigns during his time in Egypt. Qasim Amin, a French-educated upper-middle class lawyer was deemed one of the first feminists due to his rejection of the veil as oppressive—an opinion grounded largely in Baring's original argument. Amin's work, influenced by Baring's ideas, served as some of the foundational literature that inserted women and their 'subjugation' in Islam into prominent discourse surrounding colonial rule and westernization. Outside of written works, the artist Ya’qub Sanu’a (educated, like Amin, in Europe) drew political cartoons, one of which depicted women representing Egypt, Russia, France, and Britain with the Egyptian woman entirely covered. His policies are considered to by some to be representative of the "white man's burden" attitude.

Later years 

Baring returned to Britain at the age of 66, and spent a year regaining his health. In 1908, he published, in two volumes, Modern Egypt, a narrative of events in Egypt and the Sudan since 1876. In 1910, he published Ancient and Modern Imperialism, an influential comparison of the British and Roman Empires. In 1914, after World War I broke out, the Khedive Abbas II of Egypt supported the Ottomans and was deposed by the British. This freed Baring to publish his impressions of the Khedive, Abbas II, in 1915.

A lover of the classics, Baring was very well-read and spoke Greek, Latin, Italian, French, and Turkish, but he never bothered to learn Arabic – the language of the lower classes in Egypt. During the opening years of the 20th century, a nationalist movement began to appear in Egypt, but Baring, who became increasingly aloof with age, brushed it off as inconsequential.

Baring was active in politics. Having been raised to the peerage as Lord Cromer in 1892, Baring was entitled to sit in the House of Lords. He joined the free-trade wing of the Unionist Party. Baring was a leader of the anti-suffragette cause, serving as the president of the Men's League for Opposing Woman Suffrage in 1908, then in 1910–1912, the subsequent National League for Opposing Woman Suffrage.

In 1916 and aged 75, Cromer was appointed to chair the Dardanelles Commission, but it was too much strain for him to handle. In poor health, he would summon meetings at his house if forbidden to go out of doors. Historian John Grigg writes that he was “in effect killed by” the strain of the Commission.

Baring died on 29 January 1917; he is buried at Wimborne Road Cemetery, Bournemouth, in Dorset.

Family
His brother was Edward Baring, 1st Baron Revelstoke. Rowland Baring, 2nd Earl of Cromer, and Evelyn Baring, 1st Baron Howick of Glendale, were two of his sons.

Works
 Cromer, Evelyn Baring, Earl of (1908). Modern Egypt, by the Earl of Cromer. New York, The Macmillan Company. .  (2001 reprint, vol 1.)  (vol 2.)
 Cromer, Evelyn Baring, Earl of.  Modern Egypt, vol. I, New York: MacMillan, 1908
 Cromer, Evelyn Baring, Earl of.  Modern Egypt, vol. II, New York: MacMillan, 1908
 Cromer, Evelyn Baring, Earl of.  Ancient and Modern Imperialism, New York: Longmans, 1910
 Cromer, Evelyn Baring, Earl of.  Disraeli, London: MacMillan, 1912
 Cromer, Evelyn Baring, Earl of.  Political and Literary Essays, London: MacMillan, 1913

References

Sources

 
 
 
 Harrison, Robert T. Gladstone's imperialism in Egypt: techniques of domination  (Greenwood, 1995).

 Marlowe, John. Cromer in Egypt (Praeger, 1970) 332pp
 Marlowe, John. A History of Modern Egypt and Anglo-Egyptian Relations: 1800–1956 (Archon Books, 1965).
 Meyer, Karl E. and Shareen Blair Brysac "Kingmakers: the Invention of the Modern Middle East." (W.W. Norton 2008). 
 
 
  and "Cromer: Part 23: The Miracle of Egypt"History Today (April 1960) 10#4 pp 240–246.
 Sayyid-Marsot, Afaf Lutfi. Egypt and Cromer: a study in Anglo-Egyptian relations (Praeger, 1969).
 Tignor, R. L. Modernization and British colonial rule in Egypt, 1882–1914 (1966).
 Tignor, R. L. Egypt: A Short History (2011) pp 229ff  online
 Tignor, Robert L. "Lord Cromer: Practitioner and Philosopher of Imperialism." Journal of British Studies 2.2 (1963): 142–159. online

Further reading
 Cromer, Earl of. Modern Egypt (2 vol 1908) online free  1220pp

External links

 
 

 (available to read online)
  (available to read online)

 

|-

|-

1841 births
1917 deaths
People from Cromer
Evelyn
British consuls-general in Egypt
Diplomatic peers
Earls in the Peerage of the United Kingdom
19th century in Egypt
Knights Grand Cross of the Order of the Bath
Knights Grand Cross of the Order of St Michael and St George
Knights Commander of the Order of the Star of India
Companions of the Order of the Indian Empire
Members of the Order of Merit
Members of the Privy Council of the United Kingdom
Fellows of the Royal Society
Graduates of the Staff College, Camberley
Anti-suffragists
20th century in Egypt
People buried at the Wimborne Road Cemetery, Bournemouth
Male critics of feminism
Peers of the United Kingdom created by Queen Victoria
Peers created by Edward VII
Honorary Fellows of the British Academy
Presidents of the Classical Association